Clifton–Clyde USD 224 is a public unified school district headquartered in Clyde, Kansas, United States.  The district includes the communities of Clifton, Clyde, Vining, Ames, St. Joseph, and nearby rural areas.

Schools
The school district operates the following schools:
 Clifton Clyde High School, located in Clyde
 Clifton Clyde Middle School, located in Clifton
 Clifton Clyde Grade School, located in Clifton

See also
 Kansas State Department of Education
 Kansas State High School Activities Association
 List of high schools in Kansas
 List of unified school districts in Kansas

References

External links
 

School districts in Kansas